My Lucky Day may refer to:

 "My Lucky Day" (Bruce Springsteen song), 2008
 "My Lucky Day" (Chicago Fire), a television episode
 "My Lucky Day" (DoReDoS song), represented Moldova in Eurovision 2018
 "My Lucky Day" (The Killing), a television episode
 "My Lucky Day" (Scrubs), a television episode

See also
 Lucky Day (disambiguation)